Avion may refer to:

 Avion, the French and Spanish name for airplane (powered fixed-wing aircraft); coming from Latin "avis" (bird). Same family as "aviation"
 Avion II and Avion III by Clément Ader
 Avion (band)
 Avion (car)
 Avion, Pas-de-Calais, a commune of the Pas-de-Calais département in northern France
 Avión is a municipality in the province of Ourense in northern Spain 
 Avion Group, an Icelandic investment firm
 A frequent flyer program from the Royal Bank of Canada
 The Avion Newspaper, the student newspaper at Embry-Riddle Aeronautical University
 the 5th colossus from the video game Shadow of the Colossus
 The first of John Knudsen Northrop's aviation firms was named Avion Corporation
 Avion tequila, a brand of tequila produced in Jalisco, Mexico